Monilea callifera, common name shrewd trochid, is a species of sea snail, a marine gastropod mollusk in the family Trochidae, the top snails.

The Australian Faunal Directory recognizes Monilea lentiginosa Adams, 1853 as a synonym of Monilea callifera.

Description
The size of an adult shell varies between 12 mm and 24 mm. The lusterless conoidal shell is narrowly umbilicate, more or less depressed, strong and solid. Its color is whitish or yellowish, with radiating maculations or stripes above; the base unicolored or obliquely striped with the stripes often interrupted.  The conoidal spire has an acute, corneous apex. The sutures are impressed. There are about six convex whorls, the last one rounded at the periphery but often with a tendency to be biangulate there. The sculpture is densely finely lirate all over. The lirae are very closely and finely beaded by the oblique incremental striae which are prominent in the interliral spaces. The oblique aperture is rounded-quadrate and conspicuously lirate within. The ten lirae extend nearly to the edge of the outer lip. The columella is short, ending below in a denticle, concave above and reflected partly over the umbilicus, and over the termination of a strong spiral funicle, which almost fills the white umbilicus.

Distribution
This marine species occurs in the intertidal and subtidal zones along the shores of Australia (New South Wales, Northern Territory, Queensland, Western Australia), the Philippines, New Caledonia, Japan, India, Sri Lanka, the Andaman Islands.

References

 Philippi, R.A. 1849. Centuria altera Testaceorum novorum. Zeitschrift für Malakozoologie 1848: 123–128
 Nevill, G. & Nevill, H. 1874. On new marine Mollusca from the Indian Ocean. Journal of the Asiatic Society of Bengal 43(2): 21–30
 Iredale, T. 1929. Strange molluscs in Sydney Harbour. The Australian Zoologist 5(4): 337–352, pls 37–38
 Iredale, T. & McMichael, D.F. 1962. A reference list of the marine Mollusca of New South Wales. Memoirs of the Australian Museum 11: 1–109
 Cernohorsky, W.O. 1978. Tropical Pacific marine shells. Sydney : Pacific Publications 352 pp., 68 pls.
 Hickman, C.S. & McLean, J.H. 1990. Systematic revision and suprageneric classification of trochacean gastropods. Natural History Museum of Los Angeles County. Science Series 35: i–vi, 1–169
 Wilson, B. 1993. Australian Marine Shells. Prosobranch Gastropods. Kallaroo, Western Australia : Odyssey Publishing Vol. 1 408 pp. 
 Poppe G.T., Tagaro S.P. & Dekker H. (2006) The Seguenziidae, Chilodontidae, Trochidae, Calliostomatidae and Solariellidae of the Philippine Islands. Visaya Supplement 2: 1–228. page(s): 108

External links
 

callifera
Gastropods described in 1822